Class 655 of the Great Western Railway was a class of 52  locomotives designed by George Armstrong and built at the GWR's Wolverhampton Works.

Design and construction
They were built in three lots between 1892 and 1897:
 Nos. 655, 767 and 1741-1750 (Lot A3, 1892)
 Nos. 1771-1790 (Lot B3, 1892-4)
 Nos. 2701-2720 (Lot E3, 1896-7)

They were in effect a continuation of the 645 Class, with longer frames though using the same 4'6" wheels and 15'6" wheelbase, and they were the last of the larger type of tank engine to be built at Wolverhampton. Pannier tanks were later fitted to all of them, apart from No. 1772, between 1912 and 1930.

Use
They were nearly all Northern Division engines until the 1920s, though later Weymouth had as many as five. Withdrawal started in 1928, but 21 continued into British Railways ownership. Nos. 1782 and 2719 survived until November 1950.

Notes

References

Sources

External links

 No. 1790, outside Tyseley shed in 1937

0655
0-6-0ST locomotives
0-6-0PT locomotives
Railway locomotives introduced in 1892
Standard gauge steam locomotives of Great Britain
Scrapped locomotives